State Highway 358 (SH 358) is a Texas state highway that runs along the southern edge of Corpus Christi. The access road for Highway 358 is known as South Padre Island Drive (SPID).  The official division is FM 665 (Old Brownsville Road).

History
The section of the highway from SH 286 east to Corpus Christi Naval Air Station was originally designated as FM 693 on June 4, 1946.  On September 5, 1946, it was redesignated to SH 358.  The section from SH 286 northward to Spur 407 (SH 9 at the time) was originally designated as Farm to Market Road 891 on November 23, 1948 and was combined with the current route on April 24, 1958, and SH 358 was extended north to I-37 also.

Route description

SH 358 is located in Corpus Christi in Nueces County and begins at I-37 near Nueces Bay and ends at the Corpus Christi Naval Air Station on the south side of Corpus Christi Bay.  SH 358 is a freeway that follows Padre Island Drive and provides access to Padre and Mustang Islands by way of Park Road 22 (PR 22).

The freeway begins at an interchange with I-37 west of the bayfront area of Corpus Christi.  It heads south from the interchange to an interchange with SH 44 which provides access to Corpus Christi International Airport.  It continues to the south and begins to turn to the southeast just prior to a junction with FM 665 (Old Brownsville Road).  The highway continues to the southeast to an interchange with SH 286 (Crosstown Expressway).  The freeway continues to the southeast through the city to a junction with SH 357 (Rodd Field Road) just prior to Oso Bay.  After crossing the bridge over Oso Bay, the freeway heads southeast to an interchange with PR 22.  PR 22 continues to the southeast over the John F. Kennedy Memorial Causeway to Padre Island as SH 358 curves to the northeast to its eastern terminus at the Corpus Christi Naval Station.

Future

The traffic volumes along South Padre Island Drive are at an all-time high with an average daily traffic count of 153,430 vehicles in 2005. The roadway construction project consists of ramp reversals and adding auxiliary lanes to the roadway.

Exit list
 All exits are unnumbered.

References

External links

358
Freeways in Texas
Transportation in Corpus Christi, Texas
Transportation in Nueces County, Texas